Horst Kemmling is a retired German international rugby union player, having played for the TSV Victoria Linden in the Rugby-Bundesliga and the German national rugby union team.

Kemmling was, until 27 October 2012, Germany's record rugby international, having played 50 internationals for his country between 1976 and 1994. With the opening game of Germany's 2012–14 campaign, Alexander Widiker played his 51st game for his country, thereby surpassing Kemmling's record.

Kemmling has also captained Germany for a lengthy period of time during that era. During his time at Viktoria Linden, he won five German championships with the club.

He was the captain of the German team that won promotion to the A-group of European rugby in 1981, something Germany did not achieve again until 2008.

He is now the chairman of his old club, TSV Victoria Linden.

References

Living people
German rugby union players
Germany international rugby union players
TSV Victoria Linden players
Year of birth missing (living people)